St. John the Evangelist Church is a disused Catholic church in Lithium, Missouri.

History

The parish was originally established in 1904 as St. Theresa's. The first church and rectory were completed in 1906, and by the following year, it was serving as mission parish of Claryville, Missouri. In 1938, in deference to a donor who provided most of the money for the new church building, the parish was to be renamed St. John the Baptist. After the dedication of the new church that same year, a statue of the patron saint was commissioned by John Glennon, Archbishop of St. Louis. When it arrived and was uncrated, however, it recognized as St. John the Evangelist, and so it remained.

It was a mission parish of Claryville, then of Sereno, and by 1982, of Perryville. The church was closed in 1985 and its faith community invited to be part of Our Lady of Victory in Sereno.

References

Roman Catholic churches completed in 1906
Churches in the Roman Catholic Archdiocese of St. Louis
Former Roman Catholic church buildings in Missouri
Christian organizations established in 1904
Organizations disestablished in 1985
Churches in Perry County, Missouri
Lithium, Missouri
1904 establishments in Missouri
20th-century Roman Catholic church buildings in the United States